Bachachereh-ye Olya (also Romanized as Bachāchereh-ye ‘Olyā; also known as Bachāchereh and Nahr-e Bachāchereh) is a village in Noabad Rural District, Arvandkenar District, Abadan County, Khuzestan Province, Iran. At the 2006 census, its population was 32, in 5 families.

References 

Populated places in Abadan County